ACSL may refer to:

 American Computer Science League, a computer science competition primarily among US high school students
 Advanced Continuous Simulation Language, a computer language
 ANSI/ISO C Specification Language, a formal specification language for C programs
 Association of School and College Leaders, a British professional association
 Human genes encoding Acyl-CoA synthetase long-chain enzymes:
 ACSL1
 ACSL3
 ACSL4
 ACSL5
 ACSL6
 SLC27A2